William Arthur "Tige" Stone (September 18, 1901 – January 1, 1960) was an outfielder in Major League Baseball. He played for the St. Louis Cardinals in 1923.

A single in his only at-bat left Stone with a rare MLB career batting average of 1.000.

References

External links

1901 births
1960 deaths
Major League Baseball outfielders
Mercer Bears baseball players
St. Louis Cardinals players
Fort Smith Twins players
Baseball players from Georgia (U.S. state)
Sportspeople from Macon, Georgia
Baseball pitchers